The 21st Virginia Infantry Regiment was an infantry regiment raised in Virginia for service in the Confederate States Army during the American Civil War. It fought mostly with the Army of Northern Virginia.

The 21st Virginia was organized in June and mustered into Confederate service in July, 1861, at Fredericksburg, Virginia. Most of the men were recruited in the city of Richmond and the counties of Charlotte, Mecklenburg, Cumberland, and Buckingham, and Pittsylvania County. Company B was known as the Maryland Guard and recruited among Southern sympathizers in the border state.

After participating in Lee's Cheat Mountain and Jackson's Valley campaigns, the unit was assigned to J.R. Jones's and W.Terry's Brigade, Army of Northern Virginia. It took an active part in many conflicts from the Seven Days' Battles to Cold Harbor, then fought with Early in the Shenandoah Valley and the Appomattox Campaign.

This regiment reported 60 casualties at First Kernstown and in May, 1862, totaled about 600 effectives. It lost 37 killed and 85 wounded at Cedar Mountain, had 3 killed and 9 wounded at Second Manassas, and reported 4 killed and 40 wounded at Chancellorsville. Of the 236 engaged at Gettysburg about twenty percent were disabled. Only 6 officers and 50 men surrendered.

The field officers were Colonels William Gilham, John M. Patton, Jr., and William A. Witcher; Lieutenant Colonels Richard H. Cunningham, Jr., and William P. Moseley; and Majors William R. Berkeley, Alfred D. Kelly, John B. Moseley, and Scott Shipp.

See also

List of Virginia Civil War units

References

Units and formations of the Confederate States Army from Virginia
1861 establishments in Virginia
Military units and formations established in 1861
1865 disestablishments in Virginia
Military units and formations disestablished in 1865